The United States Military Specification referred to as MIL-L-63460, "Military Specification, Lubricant, Cleaner and Preservative for Weapons and Weapons Systems" (superseded by "MIL-PRF-63460, Performance Specification Lubricant, Cleaner And Preservative For Weapons And Weapons Systems" on August 5, 1985) covers a type of cleaner, lubricant, and preservative used for weapons and weapons systems. This product is referred to in the US military and sold in commercial markets under the name CLP, which is short for Cleans Lubes and Protects.

Scope of the standard
The military specification MIL-L-63460 describes the performance requirements and verification methods for a type of Lubricant, Cleaner and Preservative for Weapons and Weapons Systems. The product is for use in cleaning, lubricating and short-term preservation of both small and large caliber military weapons, operating in the temperature range of −51 to +71 °C (−60 to +160 °F).

Identification
This lubricant is identified by its U.S. Military initialism CLP and its NATO code number S-758.

Properties
CLP is a highly penetrating, mobile liquid and is intended for field application to satisfy the complete need of cleaning, lubricating, and short term preservation of military weapons. CLP facilitates the effective removal of firing residues, gums, and other contaminants from weapon components while providing lubrication and short term preservation for reliable weapons operation. CLP may be used in lieu of MIL-PRF-372, MIL-PRF-3150,MIL-PRF-14107, and MIL-L-46000 where authorized by the applicable weapons manual or lubrication order.

Lead Standardization Agency
The military standard MIL-PRF-63460 is issued and maintained by the Defense Supply Center (Richmond, VA) which is chartered under the Defense Standardization Program (DSP) with maintaining the functional expertise and serving as the DoD-wide technical focal point for the standard. The current document revision (2017) is Revision F, (i.e MIL-PRF-63430F), released on March 26, 2017. 
It superseded Revision E, Amendment 4 (i.e. MIL-PRF-63430E w/Amendment 4) which was last updated on Nov 05, 2014 which superseded Revision D (i.e. MIL-PRF-63430D) released on August 5, 1985, that in turn superseded Revision C (i.e., MIL-L-63460C) which was last updated on November 16, 1980. NOTE: A limited coordination military specification was prepared prior to a coordinated revision of MIL-L-63460, and it was referred to as MIL-L-006346C; this document was dated June 24, 1983.

References and external links
 
 
 
 
 

Military of the United States standards